Monkey jack can refer to:

 A mechanical jack
 Monkey jack fruit or its tree: Artocarpus lacucha or Artocarpus rigidus